Poor Men's Wives is a 1923 American silent drama film directed by Louis J. Gasnier and starring Barbara La Marr, David Butler and Betty Francisco. The previous year Gasnier had directed a film called Rich Men's Wives.

Synopsis
Two friends marry men from completely different social backgrounds, one a wealthy man and the other a taxi driver. When they meet by chance some time later they see how different their lives have become.

Cast
 Barbara La Marr as Laura Bedford / Laura Maberne
 David Butler as 	Jim Maherne
 Betty Francisco as Claribel
 Richard Tucker as Richard Smith-Blanton
 Zasu Pitts as Apple Annie
 Muriel McCormac as Twin
 Mickey McBan as 	Twinn

References

Bibliography
 Connelly, Robert B. The Silents: Silent Feature Films, 1910-36, Volume 40, Issue 2. December Press, 1998.
 Munden, Kenneth White. The American Film Institute Catalog of Motion Pictures Produced in the United States, Part 1. University of California Press, 1997.

External links
 
 

1923 films
1923 drama films
1920s English-language films
American silent feature films
Silent American drama films
Films directed by Louis J. Gasnier
American black-and-white films
Preferred Pictures films
1920s American films